Rebecca Shireen Matthews (born 1977) is an American lawyer from California and is a former nominee to be a United States district judge of the United States District Court for the Southern District of California.

Education 

Matthews earned her Bachelor of Arts, magna cum laude, from Georgetown University in 2000 and her Juris Doctor, cum laude, from Duke University School of Law in 2004. She is of Indian descent.

Legal career 

Upon graduation from law school, Matthews served as a law clerk for Judge Irma Elsa Gonzalez of the United States District Court for the Southern District of California. In 2005, she was hired as an associate  with Latham & Watkins in San Diego. From July 2008 to September 2013 she served as an Assistant United States Attorney in the Criminal Division of the United States Attorney's Office for the Southern District of California. She is currently a partner at Jones Day in San Diego, California.

Nomination to district court 

On August 28, 2019, President Trump announced his intent to nominate Matthews to serve as a United States district judge for the United States District Court for the Southern District of California. On October 17, 2019, her nomination was sent to the Senate. President Trump nominated Matthews to the seat vacated by Judge Barry Ted Moskowitz, who assumed senior status on January 23, 2019. On January 3, 2020, her nomination was returned to the President under Rule XXXI, Paragraph 6 of the United States Senate. On February 13, 2020, her renomination was sent to the Senate. On June 17, 2020, a hearing on her nomination was held before the Senate Judiciary Committee. On July 23, 2020, her nomination was reported out of committee by a voice vote. On January 3, 2021, her nomination was returned to the President under Rule XXXI, Paragraph 6 of the United States Senate.

References 

1977 births
Living people
20th-century American lawyers
21st-century American lawyers
American people of Indian descent
Assistant United States Attorneys
Duke University School of Law alumni
Georgetown University alumni
Jones Day people

People associated with Latham & Watkins
People from Arcadia, California
20th-century American women lawyers
21st-century American women lawyers